The 23rd San Diego Film Critics Society Awards were announced on December 10, 2018.

Winners and nominees

Best Film
Leave No Trace
The Ballad of Buster Scruggs
The Favourite
Green Book
A Quiet Place

Best Director
Debra Granik – Leave No Trace
Bo Burnham – Eighth Grade
Peter Farrelly – Green Book
John Krasinski – A Quiet Place
Yorgos Lanthimos – The Favourite

Best Male Actor
Ethan Hawke – First Reformed
Christian Bale – Vice
Lucas Hedges – Boy Erased
Viggo Mortensen – Green Book
John C. Reilly – The Sisters Brothers

Best Female Actor
Glenn Close – The Wife
Elsie Fisher – Eighth Grade
Lady Gaga – A Star Is Born
Melissa McCarthy – Can You Ever Forgive Me?
Carey Mulligan – Wildlife

Best Male Supporting Actor
Timothée Chalamet – Beautiful Boy (TIE) 
Richard E. Grant – Can You Ever Forgive Me? (TIE)
Mahershala Ali – Green Book
Joel Edgerton – Boy Erased
Sam Elliott – A Star Is Born

Best Female Supporting Actor
Nicole Kidman – Boy Erased
Nina Arianda – Stan & Ollie
Zoe Kazan – The Ballad of Buster Scruggs
Thomasin McKenzie – Leave No Trace
Alia Shawkat – Blaze

Best Comedic Performance
Hugh Grant – Paddington 2
Awkwafina – Crazy Rich Asians
Jason Bateman – Game Night
Jesse Plemons – Game Night
Ryan Reynolds – Deadpool 2

Best Original Screenplay
Bo Burnham – Eighth Grade
Wes Anderson – Isle of Dogs
Scott Beck, John Krasinski, and Bryan Woods – A Quiet Place
Joel Coen and Ethan Coen – The Ballad of Buster Scruggs
Brian Hayes Currie, Peter Farrelly, and Nick Vallelonga – Green Book

Best Adapted Screenplay
Peter Fellows, Armando Iannucci, Ian Martin, Fabien Nury, and David Schneider – The Death of Stalin
Joel Edgerton – Boy Erased
Debra Granik and Anne Rosellini – Leave No Trace
Nicole Holofcener and Jeff Whitty – Can You Ever Forgive Me?
David Lowery – The Old Man & the Gun

Best Animated Film
Isle of Dogs
Have a Nice Day
Incredibles 2
Ralph Breaks the Internet
Spider-Man: Into the Spider-Verse

Best Documentary
Three Identical Strangers
Free Solo
Love, Gilda
RBG
Won't You Be My Neighbor?

Best Foreign Language Film
Shoplifters
Capernaum
Cold War
The Guilty
Roma

Best Cinematography
Bruno Delbonnel – The Ballad of Buster Scruggs (TIE) 
Joshua James Richards – The Rider (TIE)
Alfonso Cuarón – Roma
Alexander Dynan – First Reformed
Magnus Nordenhof Jønck – Lean on Pete

Best Costume Design
Sandy Powell – The Favourite (TIE) 
Lindy Hemming – Paddington 2 (TIE)
Guy Speranza – Stan & Ollie
Mary E. Vogt – Crazy Rich Asians
Mary Zophres – The Ballad of Buster Scruggs

Best Editing
Jamie Gross and Dave Egan – Game Night
Roderick Jaynes – The Ballad of Buster Scruggs
Yorgos Mavropsaridis – The Favourite
Christopher Tellefsen – A Quiet Place
Patrick J. Don Vito – Green Book

Best Production Design
Fiona Crombie – The Favourite
Hannah Beachler – Black Panther
Tim Galvin – Green Book
John Paul Kelly – Stan & Ollie
Adam Stockhausen – Ready Player One

Best Visual Effects
Ready Player One
Black Panther
Christopher Robin
Isle of Dogs
Paddington 2

Best Use of Music in a Film
Bad Times at the El Royale
Blaze
Bohemian Rhapsody
Green Book
A Star Is Born

Best Breakout Artist
Thomasin McKenzie – Leave No Trace
Bo Burnham – Eighth Grade
Elsie Fisher – Eighth Grade
Rami Malek – Bohemian Rhapsody
Charlie Plummer – Lean on Pete

Best Ensemble
Game Night
The Ballad of Buster Scruggs
Boy Erased
The Favourite
Green Book

Best Body of Work
John C. Reilly for Ralph Breaks the Internet, The Sisters Brothers, and Stan & Ollie

References

External links
 

2018
2018 film awards
2018 in American cinema